The 1888 United States presidential election in Wisconsin was held on November 6, 1888 as part of the 1888 United States presidential election. State voters chose 11 electors to the Electoral College, who voted for president and vice president.

Republican Party candidate Benjamin Harrison won Wisconsin with 49.79 percent of the popular vote, winning the state's eleven electoral votes.

Results

Results by county

Notes

References

Wisconsin
1888 Wisconsin elections
1888